Elections were held in the Muskoka District Municipality of Ontario on October 22, 2018 in conjunction with municipal elections across the province.

Muskoka District Council
The Muskoka District Chair was originally intended to be elected by the voters in each of the municipalities. Incumbent Chair John Klinck as well as former Chairs Gord Adams and Hugh Mackenzie had filed to run for election as Chair. However, on the last day of the 2018 nomination period, Ontario Premier Doug Ford cancelled the separate election of the Muskoka District Chair. As a result, the Chair will instead be elected by members of the District Council on December 10, 2018.

Bracebridge
The following are the results for Bracebridge.

Mayor

District Councillors
Three Regional Councillors were elected.

Local Councillors
Four Local Councillors were elected in 1 of 4 wards.

Georgian Bay
The following are the results for Georgian Bay.

Mayor

District Councillors
Two District Councillors were elected in 1 of 2 wards.

Local Councillors
Four Local Councillors were elected in 1 of 4 wards.

Gravenhurst
The following are the results for Gravenhurst.

Mayor

District Councillors
Three Regional Councillors were elected.

Local Councillors
Five Local Councillors were elected in 1 of 5 wards.

Huntsville
The following are the results for Huntsville.

Mayor

District Councillors
Three Regional Councillors were elected.

Local Councillors
Five Local Councillors were elected in 1 of 4 wards.

Lake of Bays
The following are the results for Lake of Bays.

Mayor

District Councillors
Two District Councillors were elected in 1 of 2 wards.

Local Councillors
Four Local Councillors were elected in 1 of 4 wards.

Muskoka Lakes
The following are the results for Muskoka Lakes.

Mayor

District & Town Councillors
Three District & Town Councillors were elected in 1 of 3 wards.

Local Councillors
Six Local Councillors were elected in 1 of 3 wards (2 in each ward).

References 

Muskoka
District Municipality of Muskoka